In the 1940–41 season, USM Blida competed in the First Division in the 8th season of the French colonial era. They were part of the First Division and the Coupe de la Ligue.

Friendly

Competitions

Overview

League table

Results

First Division

Matches

Coupe de la Ligue d'Alger

Players statistics

|-
! colspan=12 style=background:#dcdcdc; text-align:center| Goalkeepers

|-
! colspan=12 style=background:#dcdcdc; text-align:center| Defenders

|-
! colspan=12 style=background:#dcdcdc; text-align:center| Midfielders

|-
! colspan=12 style=background:#dcdcdc; text-align:center| Forwards

|}

References

External links
La Presse libre (Alger)
L'Indépendant
L'Echo d'Alger
Le Tell

USM Blida seasons
Algerian football clubs 1940–41 season